Vogue Ukraine (or Vogue Україна in Ukrainian) is the Ukrainian edition of the American fashion and lifestyle monthly magazine Vogue. The magazine has been published since March 2013, becoming the twenty-first local edition of Vogue.

Publication history
In June 2012, it was announced that the Ukrainian edition of Vogue was in preparation, with Masha Tsukanova as editor-in-chief.

Vogue Ukraine launched in March 2013 is published in partnership with Media Group Ukraine. Magazine has become known worldwide as an artistic edition with its own visual identity. 

Vogue Ukraine is a multi-media brand including  monthly printed magazine and supplements with pdf version as well as digital platform vogue.ua with highest level of readers engagement at social medias and YouTube channels.

Editor-in-Chief 
 Masha Tsukanova (2013–2016)
 Olha Sushko (2016–2018)
 Philipp Vlasov (2019–present)

Content 

In October 2018, The Calvert Journal named the best Vogue Ukraine cover in the magazine’s five-year history:

The December 2019 issue of the Ukrainian edition of Vogue unveils a project starring Olena Zelenska, the country’s First Lady. The photo shoot featuring an international team translated into a full-fledged magazine story with the heroine telling about her life in the new capacity, new obligations and opportunities, and fashion as a tool of cultural diplomacy, according to Kyiv Post.

See also
 List of Vogue Ukraine cover models

References

External links
 Vogue Ukraine 
 

2013 establishments in Ukraine
Magazines established in 2013
Russian-language magazines
Magazines published in Ukraine
Ukrainian-language magazines
Ukraine
Women's fashion magazines
Monthly magazines